Santosh Tamang (born 6 August 1994) is a Nepali footballer who plays as a midfielder for Nepali club Biratnagar City and the Nepal national team.

References

External links
 

Living people
1994 births
Nepalese footballers
Nepal international footballers
Association football midfielders